Bifascia nigralbella is a moth in the family Cosmopterigidae. It is found in Algeria, the northern Sahara, Tunisia, Saudi Arabia, western Pakistan and India. It has also been recorded from Spain.

The wingspan is 8-8.5 mm.

The larvae feed on the flowers of Acacia species, including Acacia farnesiana and Acacia horrida. They are 7 mm long and slender. The dorsal part is yellow with red stripes in the first part.

References

External links
 BIFASCIA - Butterflies and Moths of the World on The Natural History Museum.

Moths described in 1915
Chrysopeleiinae